Jonathan Matijas (born 6 January 1990) is a French professional football player who plays for JSM Skikda.

Club career
Matijas, of Croatian origin by his father but whose maternal grandfather is Algerian, started football at home in Nice before finishing his training in Bastia where he played a match in Ligue 2 at 17, entering after expulsion of the 3rd keeper of the club.

In May 2014, Jonathan Matijas sign for USM Bel Abbès.

References

External links
 
 

1990 births
Algerian footballers
Algerian expatriate footballers
Algerian Ligue Professionnelle 1 players
Algerian people of Croatian descent
Amiens SC players
Ligue 2 players
Living people
SC Bastia players
FC UTA Arad players
French footballers
French expatriate footballers
Expatriate footballers in Thailand
Expatriate footballers in Romania
French sportspeople of Algerian descent
French people of Croatian descent
MC Alger players
USM Bel Abbès players
Association football goalkeepers
Footballers from Nice